Fabian Weinhandl (born January 3, 1987) is an Austrian professional ice hockey goaltender who is currently an unrestricted free agent who was most recently under contract to EC Red Bull Salzburg of the Austrian Hockey League (EBEL).

He previously played with EC KAC after joined the club on April 10, 2013, from the Vienna Capitals on a two-year contract. On May 27, 2015, Weinhandl returned to the EBEL after a stint on loan to Ritten/Renon in the Italian Serie A, signing a one-year deal to serve as the backup with EC Red Bull Salzburg.

He participated at the 2011 IIHF World Championship as a member of the Austria men's national ice hockey team.

References

External links

1987 births
Austrian ice hockey goaltenders
Graz 99ers players
EC KAC players
Living people
Ritten Sport players
EC Red Bull Salzburg players
Vienna Capitals players